The Zany Adventures of Robin Hood is a 1984 American made-for-television comedy film directed by Ray Austin and starring George Segal, Morgan Fairchild, Roddy McDowall, Janet Suzman and Tom Baker. It is a parody of the Robin Hood story.

Plot
In not-so-merry-old-England during the 13th Century, the neurotic Prince John (Roddy McDowell) sits on the throne, supported by his evil henchman, Sir Guy of Gisbourne (Tom Baker) and constantly ridiculed by his mother, Eleanor of Aquitaine (Janet Suzman). While celebrating his birthday, the Prince becomes unhappy when he discovers his older brother, Richard, is not dead as everyone thought but rather being held for ransom in Austria. As Richard is the rightful King of England, this creates a problem for Prince John. However, Gisbourne openly suggests that they tax the Saxon peasants to raise the ransom, while secretly confiding in the Prince that the King will most likely die of pneumonia before the year is out and that they will keep the money.

The birthday revels are interrupted by Robin Hood (George Segal), disguised in drag and reciting an offensive poem. Not seeing through the disguise, Gisbourne demands she take them to Robin Hood's hideout in Sherwood Forest. That night, Eleanor convinces Maid Marian (Morgan Fairchild) to play up to Gisbourne's advances and use him to help Robin Hood.

When Prince John and Guy travel to Sherwood, they are ambushed by Robin Hood's Merry Men. They are stripped of their garments, their possessions and money stolen, then driven out of the forest. Will Scarlet (Robin Nedwell) frequently tries to make a song out of these events, but thankfully Robin stops him every time.

Eleanor and Marian sneak into the bandits' camp at night, disguised as two nuns, and hoping to enlist Robin's help in freeing King Richard. They are caught by Robin, who recognises them immediately, and the trio eat together and discuss plans. Robin and Marian realise they love each other.

Robin and his band begin travelling across the country to raise the ransom money but nothing goes right. They try robbing a bank only to find that they have won a prize as the hundredth customer and get distracted. When they finally rob the bank, they find it only has three coins and a pfennig. Times are hard for everyone, it seems. Eventually, Robin has to report back to Eleanor that England is broke. She advises him to get the money from Isaac of York (Kenneth Griffith), a Jewish moneylender.

In York, Robin stands out like a sore thumb amongst all the orthodox Jews. Isaac agrees to lend Robin the ransom money provided that in return the King gives the Jews their own country. Isaac suggests Palestine, although Miami would be his second choice. They settle on naming the new country after Isaac's father, Israel. Robin sneaks into the Prince's castle to tell Eleanor, who now insists he must raise an army. Robin then tries to seduce Marian, promising her they'll be wed once King Richard returns, but with little success.

Starring

George Segal as Robin Hood
Morgan Fairchild as Lady Marian
Roddy McDowall as Prince John
Janet Suzman as Eleanor of Aquitaine
Tom Baker as Sir Guy of Gisbourne
Neil Hallett as the Sheriff of Nottingham
Robert Hardy as King Richard
Roy Kinnear as Friar Tuck
Robin Nedwell as Will Scarlet
Michelle Newell as Rebecca
Pat Roach as Little John

Guest starring
Kenneth Griffith as Isaac of York
Melvyn Hayes as Father Luther
Michael Hordern as Rupert

Other Cast
Aubrey Morris as Archbishop
Bruce Purchase as Moishe
Roger Ashton-Griffiths as 1st Coachman
Paul Brooke as 2nd Coachman
Tony Steedman as Bank President
Fenella Fielding as Molly
John Louis Mansi as Reuben
Kelly Summer as Miss Jones
Melanie Hughes as Miss Sanders
Colin Higgins as Irving
Peter Brayham as Yehoudi
Marc Boyle as Bernie
Andrew Lodge as Lord Exeter
Angela Grant as Lady Exeter
Su Elliot as Alice
Chris Webb as 1st Merryman
Del Baker as 2nd Merryman
Terence Plummer as 3rd Merryman
Steve Dent as 4th Merryman
Peter Brace as Captain of Guards
Fred Haggerty as 1st Guard
Fred Powell as 2nd Guard
Dinny Powell as 3rd Guard
George Lane Cooper as 4th Guard
Derek Lyons as 5th Guard
William Morgan Sheppard as Saxon thief

Locations
The production visited Kent where they used The Barron’s Hall at Penshurst Place to double as King John’s Hall and the Cathedral and Allington Castle exterior doubles as King John’s castle and the hall as the Bank of Normandy.

Reception
John J. O'Connor of The New York Times complained the film felt 'strained' and criticized the jokes and editing.

See also
1984 in film
 Robin Hood: Men in Tights (1993)

References

External links

1984 films
1984 television films
American parody films
1980s English-language films
Films set in York
Films scored by Stanley Myers
1980s parody films
Robin Hood films
Robin Hood parodies
1980s action comedy films
1984 comedy films
Films shot in Kent
Films directed by Ray Austin
1980s American films